Brandon McGee was a Connecticut state representative and former candidate for Mayor of Hartford. He served four terms in the Connecticut House of Representatives. He was interviewed by Connecticut Public Radio in August 2019.

Electoral history

2012

2014–2016

2018–2019

Notes

Sources

Citations

References

Further reading

External links 
 
 

Year of birth missing (living people)
Living people
21st-century American politicians
Politicians from Hartford, Connecticut
Democratic Party members of the Connecticut House of Representatives
African-American state legislators in Connecticut
Alabama State University alumni
Albertus Magnus College alumni
Activists from Connecticut
21st-century African-American politicians